Djenné-Djenno (also Jenne-Jeno) is a UNESCO World Heritage Site located in the Niger River Valley in the country of Mali. Literally translated to "ancient Djenné", it is the original site of both Djenné and Mali and is considered to be among the oldest urbanized centers and the best-known archaeology site in sub-Saharan Africa. The site is believed to exceed  in area; however this is yet to be confirmed with extensive survey work. With the help of archaeological excavations mainly by Roderick and Susan McIntosh, the site is known to have been occupied from 250 BC to 900 AD. The city is believed to have been abandoned and moved where the current city is located due to the spread of Islam and the building of the Great Mosque of Djenné. Previously, it was assumed that advanced trade networks and complex societies did not exist in the region until the arrival of traders from Southwest Asia. However, sites such as Djenné-Djenno disprove this, as these traditions in West Africa flourished long before. More recently, it has been concluded that the egalitarian civilization of Djenne-Djenno was likely established by the Mande progenitors of the Bozo people, which spanned from 3rd century BCE to 13th century CE.

Origins

Similar settlements had already begun to form somewhat earlier at the site of Dia, also in Mali along the Niger River, from around 900 BC, and reached their peak around 600 BC.   
With the help of archaeological excavations, radiocarbon dates have been collected showing that people first settled at Djenne-Jeno permanently in about 250 BC. This first occupation of the site (which lasted from 250 BC to 50 AD) is known as Phase I and is some of the earliest evidence for iron production in sub-Saharan Africa. This initial phase is not associated with the Later Stone Age, and there has never been an occupation from this period at the site, or evidence for it has never been found. Until 250 BC, the area surrounding Djenné-Djenno was either uninhabited or visited by nomadic groups that stayed for short periods. Geomorphological data show that the region consisted mostly of swampland at that time.  Groups only began permanently occupying the area after a dry episode in which annual flooding receded and decreased the size of the swamps. Faunal remains at the site from this occupation have included catfish and Nile perch but mostly cow, leading to the assumption that this first phase might be associated with hunter-gatherer or pastoral modes of subsistence. During this period there is no evidence for rice production, however it is believed that these people might have been rice producers, even though no definitive evidence has been discovered yet.

The considerable commonalities, absent in modern North African cultures, are present and able to be found between Round Head paintings and modern Sub-Saharan African cultures. Saharan ceramics are viewed as having clear likeness with the oldest ceramics found in Djenne-Djenno, which have been dated to 250 BCE.

Phase II is defined by a larger population and definitive evidence for the mass production of rice. The borders of the site expanded during this period (possibly covering 100,000 square meters or more). Other developments include the presence of permanent mud brick architecture, including a city wall, probably built during the latter half of the first millennium AD using the cylindrical brick technology, "which was 3.7 meters wide at its base and ran almost two kilometers around the town". It is inferred from this that rice domestication might have led to higher population, or higher populations led to the domestication of rice in this period. Phase III dates from about 300 to 900 AD and is believed to have an even higher population based on crowded cemeteries. The site also has evidence for a more intensive occupation through deep house deposits, possibly from multiple generations. Since there is no evidence for a fourth phase, it is expected that towards the end of Phase III the city experienced a slow decline in population and eventually a total abandonment. However, very little is known about why this decline happened, and more research is needed.

At the end of the site's occupation stood a large tear-shaped mound (also known as a tell) consisting of layer upon layer of occupation that had built up over time. This tell was surrounded by 69 hillocks, and created by its people through the building and rebuilding of their houses. Throughout the site's occupations, pottery fragments are abundant. Some of the more interesting clay artifacts begin in Phase II with terra-cotta statuettes and representations of humans and animals on pottery. These statuettes are important to the understanding of Phase II because along with this art, the first evidence for large-scale rice cultivation and population rise. All of these attributes are commonly associated with complex, state-level societies. It is believed that these artifacts posed ritual function as opposed to a domestic function. Some of these clay figurines are similar to those made by modern Fulani pastoralists for children, which might be evidence for the importance of domesticated cows at the site. One human statuette in particular has been the cause of much debate. It was found on a house floor around small bowls full of suspected offerings. Two others have been found in similar context 11 kilometers away from the site of  Djenné-Djenno and it is hypothesized that they are the representations of a household spirit, as ancestral cults are known to have flourished in the area as late as the 20th century.

Terra-cotta figurines from the Inner Niger Delta region

Djenné-Djenno is famous for its terracotta figurines which depict humans and animals including snakes and horses. Before the site's excavation in 1977, many of these sculptures were in circulation, being sold as tourist souvenirs and fine art to the West. During this time, Mali was experiencing famine; and it was unlikely for many to be upset about any money that came into the country. The sale of cultural antiquities has been prohibited since 1970, with the creation of the UNESCO Convention on the Means of Prohibiting and Preventing the Illicit Import, Export and Transfer of Ownership of Cultural Property, which by agreement placed all such cultural property under protection. Conflict between ownership and control of artifacts still remains a problem in the region as well as in many other parts of the world as there is a differnce between prohibitions and actual, domestic laws and international laws and treaties governing the exhumation, rights to ownership, export and import of such material. For instance, the US government only affected a ban on the importation of Malian antiquities in 1993. a b Other sculptures in West Africa have faced similar challenges. In Nigeria, Nok culture figurines dating back as far as 800 BC also became popular in black market trade in the 1990s. The US and Nigeria signed a bi-lateral agreement on this matter only in 2022. While it is believed by some that little scientific work has been done on these figurines, and that most of them are in circulation around the globe today, the fact is there is insufficient data to determine how much material remains undiscovered. Recently,  from Djenné-Djenno, in Timbuktu cultural property has also been threatened. Ethical battles over antiquities are hard to define as "the conflicts are multifaceted, questions of innocence and guilt often – through not always – hard to pin down." Art dealers and collectors depend on such trade, while the looting of artifacts from archaeological sites destroys their historical context and clouds their integrity. One may also reasonably argue that objects left in the ground are under continuous pressure from floods, shifting earth and construction activities. It has been suggested by many to have a blackout of information on those figurines that were not excavated scientifically, which primarily includes black market items, as it is believed that drawing Western attention to these items would increase their market value. Some claim this could hurt art historians and dealers, as it would be difficult for them to know how to distinguish artifacts from fakes. However, there are both subjective and scientific means such as a combination of Thermoluminescent (TL) testing and CT scanning that can reliably identify fake and compromised (pastiche) works.

Agriculture and urban organization

Historically, the Inland Niger Delta has been an ideal location for the mass production of staples such as rice, millet and vegetables due to its predictable floods and summer rains. Many believe this area was the leader in African rice domestication, however more research is needed. Along with this, evidence for domestic cow, sheep and goat cultivation is present at the site. The land surrounding Djenné-Djenno lent itself to such high-yielding crops due to its mixture of highland and floodplain soils at different elevations that allowed floodwater farming of rice. Moreover, the Djenné-Djenno site lies in close proximity to dune landscape, which allows for necessary recreation needed for keeping cattle in floodplain environments. Overall, the diversified sources of food provided food security that allowed for permanent settlement in a region of volatile climate. It is believed that this food production, especially that of African rice, was one of the main contributors to population rise in the city of Djenné-Djenno and was widely exported to nearby centers (including Timbuktu). Many believe that domestic rice was introduced from areas outside the Delta, but the idea that it could not have been manipulated all over the region should not be rejected without further evidence. It is hypothesized that after the decline in aquatic resources we see being exploited in phase I, people adapted by cultivating rice, causing this population explosion.

The Djenné-Djenno urban complex consists of 40 mounds within a four-kilometer radius. The configuration of the mounds helped “segmented” communities to surmount the ecological challenges caused by the volatile weather patterns characteristic of the Middle Niger. The fact that the mounds were disjointed allowed communities to specialize their trade while the relative proximity of the mound facilitated the exchange of goods and services between these communities. It is believed that instead of a ruling elite, Djenné-Djenno split power between corporate groups and this can be seen with the clustered organization at the site.  This means that unlike places like Egypt, Djenné-Djenno was not highly stratified and evidence for a very wealthy ruling class has never been found. This urban configuration incentivized peaceful reciprocity between the communities, which in turn caused the communities to specialize further leading to the prosperity of the community as a whole. It is hypothesized that clusters held people of similar ethnic groups and craft specializations, which would set the city up for extensive trade and growth.

Trade
It is suspected that Djenné-Djenno grew to such a vast size as a result of regional and local trade. For many years, it was assumed that complex societies, art and long distance trade came to this region with the Arab arrival in the seventh and eighth centuries. Archaeological evidence however supports that Djenné-Djenno was part of a pre-Arab trans-Saharan trade network. It has been hypothesized that the city grew as a trade center due to its location on the southern portion of the agriculturally productive region of the delta. It was likely that rice produced in this region would have been a valuable trade for Saharan commodities such as salt, copper and dried fish. Djenné-Djenno would have been an excellent middle ground between traders from North Africa and the Mediterranean and other parts of sub-Saharan Africa. No doubt the towns proximity to other large urban centers such as Timbuktu also helped this trade network thrive. Specifically, glass beads found at the site have been dated to as early as the third century BC and appear to originate from Asia to the Mediterranean Near East. Copper ornaments have also been found in early Phase II deposits, which shows these trade networks date to earlier than previously thought. These discoveries lend support to the existence of sporadic contacts between West and North Africa throughout the first millennium AD.

Notes

Sources

Further reading

 Link is to a file of the complete issue. It contains poor images.
 Link requires subscription to Aluka.

External links
Archaeology of West Africa at Rice University
Old Towns of Djenné: UNESCO World Heritage Site

Djenné
Mopti Region
Former populated places in Mali
Archaeological sites in Mali
Archaeological sites of Western Africa
250s BC establishments